Hadfield is a town in the High Peak district of Derbyshire, England. The town contains eight listed buildings that are recorded in the National Heritage List for England.  All the listed buildings are designated at Grade II, the lowest of the three grades, which is applied to "buildings of national importance and special interest".  The listed buildings consist of houses, a public house and a church, and, apart from the church, they are located near the centre of the town.


Buildings

References

Citations

Sources

 

Lists of listed buildings in Derbyshire